The canton of Romorantin-Lanthenay is an administrative division of the Loir-et-Cher department, central France. It was created at the French canton reorganisation which came into effect in March 2015. Its seat is in Romorantin-Lanthenay.

It consists of the following communes:
Loreux
Millançay
Romorantin-Lanthenay
Veilleins
Vernou-en-Sologne
Villeherviers

References

Cantons of Loir-et-Cher